Eukaryotic Cell was an academic journal published by the American Society for Microbiology (ASM). The journal published findings from basic research studies of simple eukaryotic microorganisms. In January 2016, EC was merged into the cross-disciplinary ASM journal mSphere. It is indexed/abstracted in: Agricola, Biological Abstracts, BIOSIS Previews, CAB Abstracts, Cambridge Scientific Abstracts, Current Contents Life Sciences Illustrata, MEDLINE, Science Citation Index Expanded, Summon, and more.

External links 
Eukaryotic Cell

Biology journals
Delayed open access journals
American Society for Microbiology academic journals